Farm to Market Roads in Texas are owned and maintained by the Texas Department of Transportation (TxDOT).

FM 2200

Farm to Market Road 2200 (FM 2200) is located in Medina County.

FM 2200 begins at an intersection with US 90 in D'Hanis. The highway travels in a southern direction along the eastern edge of the town, leaving the city limits near County Road 5223. FM 2200 generally runs in a southern direction through rural farming areas, turning east at County Road 731. The highway has an overlap with FM 462 near Yancey. After leaving Yancey, FM 2200 mostly runs in an eastern direction towards Devine, ending at an intersection with SH 173.

FM 2200 was extended  to US 90 on May 6, 1964.

Junction list

FM 2200 (1953)

The highway was cancelled and combined with FM 537 on October 29, 1954.

FM 2201

Farm to Market Road 2201 (FM 2201) is located in Palo Pinto County.

FM 2201 begins at an intersection with FM 4 in Santo. The highway travels in a northeast direction before turning in a more eastern direction near the Santo Volunteer Fire Department. FM 2201 continues to travel in a mostly eastern direction through rural farming areas, ending at an intersection with US 281 just north of I-20.

FM 2201 was designated on December 2, 1953, along the current route.

FM 2202

Farm to Market Road 2202 (FM 2202) is located in Moore County in the Panhandle.

FM 2202 begins at an intersection with SH 354. The highway travels in a northern direction, ending at an intersection with FM 722. FM 2202 is rural for its entire length, traveling near several farms and ranches.

FM 2202 was designated on October 28, 1953, along the current route.

FM 2203

Farm to Market Road 2203 (FM 2203) is located in Moore County in the Panhandle.

FM 2203 begins at an intersection with SH 152 in Dumas. The highway travels in a northern direction along Maddox Avenue through a suburban area of the town. FM 2203 leaves Dumas at an intersection with McClary Lane, with the route becoming more rural. The highway travels in a northern direction through rural farming and ranching areas, ending at an intersection with FM 119 near the North Plains Country Club.

FM 2203 was designated on October 28, 1953, along the current route.

FM 2204

Farm to Market Road 2204 (FM 2204) is located in Gregg County. It runs from US 259 Bus. in Kilgore east to SH 322 at East Texas Regional Airport. It is known locally as Stone Road. FM 2204 was designated on October 28, 1953, along its current route.

Junction list

FM 2205

Farm to Market Road 2205 (FM 2205), known locally as Jaycee Road, runs from Loop 281 east to SH 31 in Longview.

FM 2205 was designated on October 28, 1953, along its current route. On June 27, 1995, the route was redesignated Urban Road 2205 (UR 2205). The designation reverted to FM 2205 with the elimination of the Urban Road system on November 15, 2018.

FM 2206

Farm to Market Road 2206 (FM 2206), known locally as Harrison Road, runs from SH 42 near White Oak east to Loop 281 in Longview.

FM 2206 was designated on October 28, 1953, along its current route. On June 27, 1995, the route was redesignated Urban Road 2206 (UR 2206). The designation reverted to FM 2206 with the elimination of the Urban Road system on November 15, 2018.

FM 2207

Farm to Market Road 2207 (FM 2207) runs from SH 135 near Kilgore northwest to SH 135 near Liberty City.

FM 2207 was designated on October 28, 1953, from SH 135 south to FM 1252. On October 26, 1954, it was extended south to SH 135.

Junction list

FM 2208

Farm to Market Road 2208 (FM 2208) runs from US 80 in Longview northeast to FM 134 near Jefferson.

FM 2208 was designated on October 28, 1953, from US 80 to the Harrison County line. On October 31, 1957, it extended to FM 449. On December 31, 1959, it extended replacing part of FM 449 to FM 450 and replaced FM 2256 from FM 450 to FM 134. On October 27, 1963, the section from FM 450 to FM 2657 was transferred to FM 449, along with FM 2657 itself. On June 27, 1995, the section from FM 2879 to US 80 was redesignated Urban Road 2208 (UR 2208). The designation reverted to FM 2208 with the elimination of the Urban Road system on November 15, 2018.

FM 2209

Farm to Market Road 2209 (FM 2209) is located in Willacy County.

FM 2209 begins at an intersection with County Road 380. The highway travels in an eastern direction, turning south at an unnamed county road. FM 2209 intersects FM 3142, then travels through the town of San Perlita. The highway continues to travel in a southern direction, ending at an intersection with SH 186. FM 2209's route is rural for most of its length, traveling through large, marshy farming areas.

On May 31, 1973, the highway's routing was changed, with the old route east of San Perlita being renumbered FM 3142, while FM 2209 was rerouted replacing a section of SH 186 to FM 497. SH 186 was truncated, but SH 186 was signed but not designated along FM 497. The redesignation of FM 497 to SH 186 became official on August 26, 1990.

Junction list

FM 2210

Farm to Market Road 2210 (FM 2210) is located in Jack and Wise counties.

FM 2210 begins at an intersection with FM 4 in the Bartons Chapel area. The highway travels in an eastern direction, turning south at Pump Station Road, then turning back east near Heliport Road. FM 2210 continues to run in an eastern direction, intersecting US 281 in Perrin. A few miles east of Perrin, the highway turns north at Lone Star Road, intersects SH 199 southeast of Joplin, then turns back to the east near Willow Point. FM 2210 continues to run in an eastern direction, ending at an intersection with FM 920 in Balsora.

On September 20, 1961, a farm-to-market road from Gibtown to FM 2350 was designated. The highway was extended  to a road intersection northwest of Perrin on October 3, 1961, absorbing all of FM 2350. The highway was extended  westward to FM 206 (now FM 4) on June 28, 1963. The highway was extended  to FM 920 at Balsora on May 7, 1970.

Junction list

FM 2211

FM 2212

FM 2213

FM 2214

FM 2215

Farm to Market Road 2215 (FM 2215) is located in southeast Henderson County. It runs about  within Berryville, from SH 155 north of Frankston eastward to CR 4117, near the western shore of Lake Palestine.

The current FM 2215 was commissioned on April 25, 1978.

FM 2215 (1954)

A previous route numbered FM 2215 was designated in Erath County on January 27, 1954, running  from FM 8 near Stephenville southeastward to US 67. FM 2215 was removed from the state highway system on August 1, 1967, in exchange for FM 988, and was cancelled when that route opened.

FM 2216

FM 2216 (1953)

The original FM 2216 was designated on December 1, 1953, from the Texas-Oklahoma state line south, southeast, and south 18.4 miles to FM 289 (now SH 15) at Gruver. FM 2216 was cancelled on November 21, 1963, and transferred to SH 136.

FM 2217

Farm to Market Road 2217 (FM 2217) is located in Hudspeth County.  It connects  I-10 with  FM 192.

FM 2217 runs  southward from I-10 at exit 81 about 4 miles east of McNary, then eastward before ending at FM 192.

On February 25, 1954, FM 2217 was designated from  US 80 (present-day I-10) southeastward to FM 192.

FM 2218

Farm to Market Road 2218 (FM 2218) is located in Fort Bend County. The highway begins at SH 36 in Pleak, heads northeast through Rosenberg and ends at FM 1640 in Richmond.

FM 2218 begins at a traffic signal on SH 36 in Pleak. There is a filling station on the northeast corner and the Pleak City Hall is nearby. The highway immediately heads northeast. On the outskirts of Pleak, FM 2218 curves north, then it turns north-northeast near the Meadow Bend Park Estates subdivision. Near Lane Airpark, the highway veers northeast again. At a distance  from its starting point, the highway comes to the I-69/US 59 overpass. FM 2218 continues northeast from I-69/US 59 through Rosenberg, with traffic lights at Airport Avenue, Avenue N, Reading Road and Town Center Boulevard. This stretch of the highway is also known as B. F. Terry Boulevard. B. F. Terry High School in the Lamar Consolidated Independent School District is situated on the northwest side of FM 2218 between Airport and Avenue N. The highway ends at a traffic signal on FM 1640. There is a Walmart on the south side and a Wharton County Junior College campus on the north side.

FM 2218 was first designated on March 24, 1954, to run from FM 1640 at Richmond to SH 36 at Pleak. Since its original authorization there has been no change to the route.

Junction list

FM 2219

FM 2220

Farm to Market Road 2220 (FM 2220) is located in Hidalgo County. It runs from FM 1925 to FM 1016.

On May 2, 1962, the road was extended north  to FM 1925. On June 27, 1995, the entire route was redesignated Urban Road 2220 (UR 2220). On April 25, 1996, a section from US 83 and Spur 487 south to FM 1016 was added, creating a gap. This gap was closed on December 19, 1996, when the route was extended from Business US 83 to US 83, replacing Spur 487. The designation of the route reverted to FM 2220 with the elimination of the Urban Road system on November 15, 2018.

FM 2221

RM 2222

Ranch to Market Road 2222 (RM 2222) is located in Travis County.

FM 2223

Farm to Market Road 2223 (FM 2223) is located in Brazos County. It is known locally as Old Cameron Ranch Road.

The current FM 2223 was designated on its current route on October 26, 1954.

FM 2223 (May 1954)

The original FM 2223 was designated on May 21, 1954, from FM 201 (now FM 56) southwest to the Paluxy River. FM 2223 was cancelled five months later and transferred to FM 204 (now FM 51).

FM 2224

FM 2225

FM 2225 (1954)

On November 21, 1956, the road was extended southeast  to US 281. FM 2225 was cancelled on July 18, 1958, and removed from the highway system as the county could not acquire right-of-way for the route.

FM 2226

FM 2227

Farm to Market Road 2227 (FM 2227) was located in Ector County.

The highway was cancelled on September 29, 1992, with the mileage being transferred to FM 1882.

FM 2228

FM 2229

FM 2230

FM 2231

FM 2232

FM 2232 (1954)

The original FM 2232 was designated on September 29, 1954, from FM 717, 10 miles south of Caddo, east  to the Palo Pinto County line. FM 2232 was cancelled two months later and became a portion of FM 207.

RM 2233

FM 2233 (1954)

The highway was extended  southeastward to a road intersection near Fabens on November 29, 1955. FM 2233 was cancelled on December 19, 1959, becoming part of I-10.

FM 2233 (1961)

On May 6, 1964, the road was extended north to FM 1187. The highway was cancelled fifteen days later, with the mileage being transferred to FM 731.

FM 2234

Farm to Market Road 2234 (FM 2234) is an urban and suburban route between Missouri City and Pearland, south-southwest of Houston. Beginning at Alternate Highway 90, the road follows a southerly path through neighborhoods of Missouri City, in Fort Bend County, passing briefly through Stafford. After making an east curve, FM 2234 passes briefly through Houston and then crosses under the Fort Bend Parkway. It then travels into more undeveloped areas, for a distance following a south boundary of Houston. After intersecting with FM 521, FM 2234 enters Brazoria County and ends at SH 288 in the Shadow Creek Ranch area of Pearland. The highway is signed north–south until it reaches the FM 521 intersection, from which it is signed as an east–west highway.

FM 2234 was designated on September 29, 1954, from US 59 (now US 90 Alternate) to the Blue Ridge State Prison Farm (current junction with Blue Ridge Road). On September 21, 1955, it was extended east to FM 521. On April 30, 1987, it was extended east to SH 288. Effective June 27, 1995, FM 2234 was re-designated as Urban Road 2234 (UR 2234). The designation reverted to FM 2234 with the elimination of the Urban Road system on November 15, 2018.

The portion within Missouri City is also known as Texas Parkway.

Junction list

FM 2235

FM 2236

Farm to Market Road 2236 (FM 2236) is located in Crosby County.

FM 2236 was designated on September 21, 1955, on its current route.

FM 2236 (1954)

The original FM 2236 was designated on September 29, 1954, from FM 240 east  to US 87 some 9 miles northwest of Cuero. This was eliminated by 1955.

FM 2237

FM 2238

FM 2239

FM 2240

Farm to Market Road 2240 (FM 2240) is located in Bowie County in the city of Texarkana. The highway is known locally as Moores Lane.

FM 2240 begins at an intersection with FM 559. The highway travels in an eastern direction through a suburban area, passing Pleasant Grove Middle School and the First Baptist Church, ending at an intersection with FM 1397. FM 2240 is three lanes for its entire length: one eastbound lane, one westbound, and a center turn-lane.

The current FM 2240 was designated on June 22, 1964, from FM 559 to FM 1397. On June 27, 1995, the route was redesignated Urban Road 2240 (UR 2240). The designation reverted to FM 2240 with the elimination of the Urban Road system on November 15, 2018.

Junction list

FM 2240 (1954)

This highway was cancelled on May 15, 1964, with the mileage being transferred to FM 1322.

RM 2241

RM 2242

RM 2243

Ranch to Market Road 2243 (RM 2243) is located in Williamson County.

RM 2243 begins in Leander, at an intersection with  US 183. It travels to the east along South Street, crossing the current 183A Toll Road along its current non-controlled-access northern stub. RM 2243 then crosses the Ronald Reagan Boulevard arterial, which provides access to  FM 734 and  RM 1431 in Cedar Park to the south and to  SH 29 to the north. Farther east, the route enters Georgetown, where it is known as Leander Drive, and has a junction with I-35 at its exit 260. The RM 2243 designation ends at South Austin Avenue (the former I-35 Business, now designated  Spur 26). The roadway continues as FM 1460.

RM 2243 was first designated on September 29, 1954, as Farm to Market Road 2243 (FM 2243), connecting US 183 in Leander to US 81 (later replaced by I-35 Business) in Georgetown. The segment west of US 183 was removed from the state highway system and returned to the city of Leander's jurisdiction on April 24, 2003.

Junction list

RM 2244

Ranch to Market Road 2244 (RM 2244) is located in Travis County.

FM 2245

FM 2246

FM 2247

Farm to Market Road 2247 (FM 2247) is located in Comanche County.

The southern terminus of FM 2247 is at SH 16 in Comanche. North of Comanche, FM 2247 has an intersection with FM 588. The route's northern terminus is at an intersection with FM 587 west of De Leon.

FM 2247 was designated on September 29, 1954, from Comanche to a junction with FM 588  to the north. On April 23, 1958, FM 588 was truncated, with the segment from this junction north to FM 587 being transferred to FM 2247. The spur connection was designated on May 24, 1963.

RM 2248

FM 2248

On July 28, 1955, the road was extended northeast 
 to the Hamilton County line. The highway was cancelled on September 2, 1955, with the mileage being transferred to FM 2005.

FM 2249

Farm to Market Road 2249 (FM 2249) is located in Hudspeth County. It runs eastward through the city, intersecting FM 1437, before ending at FM 1576.

FM 2249 was designated on September 29, 1954, from Dell City,  eastward and  northward. On December 17 of that year, its routing was changed so that it went  eastward and  northward. On July 28, 1955, FM 2249 was extended west . On September 18, 1957, the south–north portion was transferred to FM 1576.

FM 2250

FM 2251

FM 2252

Farm to Market Road 2252 (FM 2252) is located in Greater San Antonio.

FM 2252 begins at a junction with Interstate 410 in San Antonio, and travels north along Perrin-Beitel Road. It crosses the controlled-access portion of Wurzbach Parkway, and turns to the northeast, where the route becomes Nacogdoches Road. FM 2252 intersects Loop 1604 before entering Comal County and the community of Bracken. The route continues to the northeast, intersecting FM 3009 in Garden Ridge, before making a dogleg turn to the southeast at the intersection with Old Nacogdoches Road. Here, FM 2252 changes cardinal directions, from south–north to west–east. FM 2252 ends at an intersection with FM 482, which provides access to Interstate 35 in Schertz.

FM 2252 was designated on October 13, 1954, with a northern terminus at the Comal County line. It was extended to its current length on September 5, 1973, through Comal County to and along FM 1337 which started at Bracken, with a spur route into Bracken. The spur route was removed on March 31, 1976. On June 27, 1995, the portion between I-410 and FM 3009 was officially changed to Urban Road 2252 (UR 2252); the designation reverted to FM 2252 with the elimination of the Urban Road system on November 15, 2018. The section of FM 2252 south of Loop 1604 was proposed for decommissioning in 2014 as part of TxDOT's San Antonio turnback proposal, which would have turned back over 129 miles of roads to the city of San Antonio, but the city of San Antonio rejected that proposal.

Junction list

FM 2253

Farm to Market Road 2253 (FM 2253) is located in Bowie County.

FM 2253 begins at an intersection with US 82 in eastern Leary. The highway travels in a generally northern direction, intersecting I-30 and FM 2148 before leaving the town. North of Leary, FM 2253 travels through rural areas with playa lakes and farms, ending at an intersection with FM 559 northeast of Wamba.

On May 26, 1966, the highway was extended  southward to US 82 over part of FM 2148.

Junction list

FM 2254

FM 2255

Farm to Market Road 2255 (FM 2255) is located in Lubbock.

FM 2255 begins at an intersection with Spur 309 in Lubbock near Reese Center. The highway runs east, meeting FM 179 (Inler Avenue) at a stop sign-controlled intersection. Between Inler Avenue and Milwaukee Avenue, FM 2255 runs in a rural area of northern Lubbock. East of Milwaukee Avenue, the highway sees much more development along its route, including commercial developments and numerous subdivisions. From Quaker Avenue to US 82 (Marsha Sharp Freeway), FM 2255 runs through the northern half of Texas Tech University and passes by University Medical Center. The highway ends at an interchange with the Marsha Sharp Freeway.

The entire highway is known locally in Lubbock as 4th Street.

FM 2255 was designated on September 21, 1955, from War Highway 5 (now Spur 309) east to west Lubbock City Limits. On March 29, 1956, FM 2255 was extended east to US 82. On June 27, 1995, FM 2255 changed to Urban Road 2255 (UR 2255). The designation reverted to FM 2255 with the elimination of the Urban Road system on November 15, 2018.

Junction list

FM 2255 (1954)

The original FM 2255 was designated on October 13, 1954, from SH 24 (now US 380) in Bryson, southward . The road became part of FM 1191 on February 15, 1955.

FM 2256

FM 2256 (1954)

The original FM 2256 was designated on October 13, 1954, from SH 154 southeast of Harleton northeast  to US 59 south of Jefferson. On May 25, 1955, the road was extended northeast  over former US 59 to FM 134 near Jefferson. On January 29, 1959, the road was extended southwest  to FM 450. FM 2256 was cancelled on December 31, 1959, and transferred to FM 2208.

FM 2257

Farm to Market Road 2257 (FM 2257) is located in Parker and Tarrant counties.

In 1965, the highway was extended  southward to SH 199.

FM 2257 begins at an intersection with SH 199 between Springtown and Azle. The highway travels in a mostly northern direction along Jay Bird Lane before turning east onto Knob Hill Road at an intersection with Knob Road. FM 2257 continues to travel east along Knob Hill Road before ending at an intersection with FM 730 in Briar.

FM 2257 (1954)

The original FM 2257 was designated on October 13, 1954, from SH 150 at Waverly southeast  to a road intersection. FM 2257 was cancelled on November 28, 1958, and transferred to FM 1725.

FM 2258

FM 2259

FM 2260

FM 2261

FM 2262

FM 2263

FM 2264

FM 2265

FM 2265 was designated on September 20, 1961, from SH 114 east to FM 1655. On June 1, 1965, FM 2265 was extended west to FM 2127.

FM 2265 (1954)

The first use of FM 2265 was designated on October 26, 1954, from FM 66 at Itasca southeast  to US 77 some 10 miles northeast of Hillsboro. This was cancelled and removed from the designated highway system on January 24, 1955, in exchange for extending FM 309, FM 934, and FM 1242.

FM 2265 (1955)

The second use of FM 2265 was designated on September 21, 1955, from US 70, 2.3 miles west of the Floyd-Motley County line, northward  to a road intersection. FM 2265 was cancelled on March 24, 1958, and mileage was transferred to FM 28.

FM 2265 (1958)

The third use of FM 2265 was designated on October 31, 1958, from FM 4 northeastward  to west of Brazos. This was cancelled on December 15, 1959, and mileage was transferred to FM 129.

FM 2266

FM 2267

FM 2268

FM 2269

FM 2270

FM 2270 (1954)

The original FM 2270 was designated on October 25, 1954, from SH 95, south of Holland, east  to Vilas. FM 2270 was cancelled on December 31, 1959, and transferred to FM 2268.

FM 2271

FM 2272

FM 2273

Farm to Market Road 2273 (FM 2273) is located in Brown County. The road begins at US 183 south of May, and continues west until it reaches FM 2559 northeast of Grosvenor, where it subsequently changes numbers.

FM 2273 was designated on October 26, 1954, along its current route.

FM 2274

Farm to Market Road 2274 (FM 2274) is located in east-northeast Cherokee County. It runs from SH 204 in Ponta to FM 856 south of Concord.

FM 2274 was designated on October 26, 1954, running  between SH 204 at Ponta and US 79. On May 6, 1964, the route was extended  northward to US 79 and to FM 856 near Concord. 
Junction list

FM 2275

Farm to Market Road 2275 (FM 2275) runs from US 271 in Gladewater east to US 259 in Longview. It is known as Vesta Avenue in Gladewater, and as George Richey Road elsewhere along its route.

FM 2275 was designated on October 26, 1954, from US 271 east to FM 1403 (now SH 300). On June 27, 1995, the entire route was redesignated Urban Road 2275 (UR 2275); the designation of the route reverted to FM 2275 with the elimination of the Urban Road system on November 15, 2018.

Junction list

FM 2276

Farm to Market Road 2276 (FM 2276) runs from SH 323 near Henderson north to FM 2087 near Kilgore.

FM 2276 was designated on October 26, 1954, from FM 2087 to SH 322. On March 29, 1957, FM 2276 was rerouted to end at US 259. On May 6, 1964, FM 2276 was extended to SH 323.

Junction list

RM 2277

 Originally this was FM 2277.

FM 2278

FM 2279

FM 2280

FM 2280 (1954)

The original FM 2280 was designated on October 26, 1954, from SH 36 at Jonesboro east  to FM 182 at Turnersville. FM 2280 was cancelled on March 21, 1958, and transferred to FM 217, although this did not take effect until the 1959 Travel Map was released.

FM 2281

Farm to Market Road 2281 (FM 2281) is located in southeastern Denton County. The highway begins at Hebron Parkway in Carrollton and runs north to the Sam Rayburn Tollway in Lewisville. It is known locally as Old Denton Road.

FM 2281 was designated on October 26, 1954, from FM 544 south to the Denton–Dallas county line. On July 28, 1994, FM 2281 was extended north to SH 121. On June 27, 1995, the entire route was redesignated Urban Road 2281 (UR 2281). On November 16, 2000, the section south of Hebron Parkway was given to the city of Carrollton. The designation of the extant section reverted to FM 2281 with the elimination of the Urban Road system on November 15, 2018.

Junction list

FM 2282

FM 2283

FM 2284

FM 2285

FM 2286

FM 2287

FM 2287 (1954)

The original FM 2287 was designated on October 26, 1954, from US 59, 3.3 miles northeast of Orange Grove, northwest  to the Live Oak County line. On September 21, 1955, the road was extended north  to Lagarto. FM 2287 was cancelled on May 18, 1966, and became a portion of FM 534, although this section was not signed as FM 534 until 1967.

FM 2288

Farm to Market Road 2288 (FM 2288) is located in Tom Green County.

FM 2288 begins at an intersection with US 67 in western San Angelo near a major retail center. The highway travels in a north/northwest direction near a large subdivision then leaves the city near an intersection with RM 853. After leaving San Angelo, FM 2288 curves and bends around San Angelo State Park and the southern and western shores of O.C. Fisher Reservoir. The highway crosses over the North Concho River and enters the town of Grape Creek, ending at a junction with US 87.

The section of FM 2288 between US 67 and RM 853 was redesignated Urban Road 2288 (UR 2288) on June 27, 1995. The designation reverted to FM 2288 with the elimination of the Urban Road system on November 15, 2018.

Junction list

FM 2289

FM 2290

RM 2291

 Originally this was FM 2291.

FM 2292

FM 2293

FM 2294

FM 2295

FM 2296

FM 2297

FM 2297 (1954)

FM 2297 was cancelled on May 23, 1956, and removed from the highway system because the county could not acquire right-of-way for the route.

FM 2298

FM 2298 (1954)

FM 2298 was cancelled on May 23, 1956, and removed from the highway system because the county could not acquire right-of-way for the route.

FM 2298 (1956)

The next use of the FM 2298 designation was in Hunt County, from FM 1570 near Majors Field north  to US 69. FM 2298 was cancelled on March 5, 1959, and transferred to FM 1570.

FM 2299

FM 2299 (1954)

FM 2299 was cancelled on May 23, 1956, and removed from the highway system because the county could not acquire right-of-way for the route.

FM 2299 (1956)

The next use of the FM 2299 designation was in Rains County, from SH 19 at Emory to a point  miles north. On October 31, 1957, the road was extended north  to FM 275 at Daugherty. FM 2299 was cancelled on December 31, 1959, and transferred to FM 275.

Notes

References

+22
Farm to market roads 2200
Farm to Market Roads 2200